Brodské is a village and municipality in Skalica District in the Trnava Region of western Slovakia.

Brodské is a small village lying on the left side of the Morava river, which makes border with the Czech republic and Austria. In historical records the village was first mentioned in 1163. The population of Brodské is around 2370 inhabitants (2006).
In the middle of the village there is a Roman Catholic church devoted to St. Anton abbot, council and post.

Geography
The municipality lies at an altitude of 159 metres and covers an area of 19.893 km².

Genealogical resources

The records for genealogical research are available at the state archive "Statny Archiv in Bratislava, Slovakia"

 Roman Catholic church records (births/marriages/deaths): 1653-1895 (parish A)
 Lutheran church records (births/marriages/deaths): 1786-1895 (parish B)

See also
 List of municipalities and towns in Slovakia

References

External links

 Official page
https://web.archive.org/web/20071027094149/http://www.statistics.sk/mosmis/eng/run.html
Surnames of living people in Brodske

Villages and municipalities in Skalica District